Karin Antonia Nadine van der Laag (born 2 August 1971), is a South African actress, writer, script supervisor and casting director. She is best known for her role as Maggie Webster in the popular soap opera Isidingo on SABC 3. She is also an independent casting director, writer and script supervisor. She has worked as  a part time judge, coach and mentor for among others the National Eistedfod Association, The South African National Community Theatre Association (SANCTA) and Talent Africa.

Personal life
She was born on 2 August 1971 in Marymount Hospital, Johannesburg, South Africa. She graduated with a Bachelor of Arts degree in Drama and English from the University of Cape Town and later obtained a Performer's Diploma in Speech and Drama.

Career
She started her television acting career at the age of 7 where she played role in the SABC Christmas production They Came from Afar. In 1998, she played the role of 'Maggie Webster' in the popular soap opera Isidingo. In 2011, she won the SAFTA Award For Best Actress in a TV Soap for this role. She became the head casting director for this soap from 2000 to 2010.

She has acted in various television productions including: Zero Tolerance, Going Up, Hard Copy, Justice for All, The Three Investigators, Wild at Heart and Sorted. In 2015, she performed with Boris Kodjoe as 'Gail Ferreira' in the international television mini-series Cape Town. Apart from television, she has performed in several international films including : The Story of an African Farm with Richard E. Grant, Les Deux Mondes, Hoodlum and Son, Hey Boy and God is African.

She is an award-winning Casting Director.

She won the FNB National Vita award for Best Performance by an Actress in a Comedy role. Later she was nominated for another FNB Vita Award for Most Outstanding Performance in Musical Theater. Meanwhile, she won both the FNB Vita Award and the Fleur du Cap award for Best Actress in a Supporting Role. In 2017 she was appointed as one of the judges in the reality competition The Final Cut which aired on SABC3.

She currently works as an actress, writer and Script Supervisor in the film and television industry.

Filmography

Acting filmography

References

External links
 

Living people
1971 births
South African casting directors
Women casting directors
South African film actresses
South African television actresses
South African television directors
Women television directors